The O'Neill dynasty (Irish: Ó Néill) are a lineage of Irish Gaelic origin that held prominent positions and titles in Ireland and elsewhere. As kings of Cenél nEógain, they were historically the most prominent family of the Northern Uí Néill, along with the O'Donnell dynasty. The O'Neills hold that their ancestors were kings of Ailech during the Early Middle Ages, as descendants of Niall of the Nine Hostages.

Two of their progenitors were High Kings of Ireland, Niall Glúndub (from whom they take their name) and Domnall ua Néill. From 1232 until 1616, the O'Neill were sovereign kings of Tír Eógain, holding territories in the north of Ireland in the province of Ulster; particularly around modern County Tyrone, County Londonderry and County Antrim, in what is now Northern Ireland. After their realm was merged with the Kingdom of Ireland and the land was caught up in the Plantation of Ulster, they were involved in a number of significant events, such as Tyrone's Rebellion, the Flight of the Earls, the Irish Rebellion of 1641 and the Irish Confederate Wars.

Naming conventions

Origins
The O'Neill lineage claims descent from Niall Glúndub, a 10th-century king of Ailech as well as High King of Ireland. Niall descended from the Cenél nEógain branch of the Northern Uí Néill. The first to adopt the patronymic surname was Niall Glúndub's great-grandson, Flaithbertach Ua Néill.

The lineage does not receive a mention in non-Irish recorded history sources between the 1080s and 1160s, from which they emerge from a "very murky background". In 1167, King of Ireland Ruaidrí Ua Conchobhair marched north and divided the kingdom of Ailech into two. The portion north of Slieve Gallion, was given to Niall Mac Lochlainn (McLaughlin), with the portion south of Slieve Gallion, given to Áed Ua Néill. After this the two rival dynasties contested for control over Tír Eoghain until the battle of Caimeirge in 1241, where the O'Neills wiped out the MacLoughlin leadership.

O'Neills of Tyrone
After 1241, the O'Neill lineage dominated and displaced other lineage, using the disruption of the Norman invasion of Ireland in 1169 to their benefit and were able to consolidate. The Bruce Invasion of Ireland devastated the Norman Earldom of Ulster, which held sway over eastern Ulster and most of its north coast all the way to Derry. Its collapse in 1333 allowed a branch of the O'Neill that had been on good terms with the Normans, Clandeboye, to step into the power vacuum and take control over large parts of eastern Ulster.

The dominant Gaelic and Norman-Irish leaders were in tune with their contemporary peers of the Middle Ages in terms of education, international trade, and diplomacy. The O'Neills had strong family relationships with the FitzGerald dynasty, both the Earls of Kildare and Earls of Desmond; the Earl of Pembroke via de Clare's marriage to the Irish house of Diarmuid, King of Leinster; and the MacDonnells, Bissetts, MacLeans, and Campbells.

In 1171, King Henry II of England came to Ireland to remove the authority of the English lords in Ireland. He met the leading Irish kings and received the pledge of fealty from them. During the Middle Ages, the O'Neills were active politically and militarily throughout Ireland, occasionally sending nobility to fight within Ireland and in campaigns in Europe. From 1312 to 1318, their kings were staunch supporters of King Robert the Bruce and his brother Edward Bruce. They sent troops and supported Edward in his attempt to become King of Ireland in 1315. In the 14th century Edward III of England called Tyrone "the Great O'Neill" and invited him to join a campaign against the Scots, and another O'Neill prince accompanied the English king on a crusade to the Holy Land. In 1394 Richard II of England deemed King Niall Mór "Le Grand O'Neill" upon a friendly hosting of the two kings. In 1493, Henry VII of England referred to Henry O'Neill, King of Tyrone, as "the Chief of the Irish Kings" and gave him a gift of livery.

The O'Neills' independent stature within Ulster began to change with the ascent of King Henry VIII to the throne in England in 1509. Soon after he took the English throne, Henry decided to grasp Ireland via a reputed papal bull that claimed to grant the lordship of Ireland to English kings. This was spurred by the 1537 Rising of Silken Thomas Fitzgerald. The O'Neills supported their FitzGerald dynasty cousins in that rebellion and had to maneuver politically to keep the English from toppling their power in Ulster when the rising failed. Henry began a policy to reduce the kings in Ireland to the same rank and structure as the English nobility. In the policy called Surrender and regrant Irish monarchs were forced to surrender their titles and independent lands to Henry, and in return he created them Earls of the Kingdom of Ireland and "granted" them their own lands back. The last King of Tyrone and first original earldom was one such grant by Henry VIII in 1542 to Conn Bacach O'Neill, on the creation of the Kingdom of Ireland. Conn wanted to be named the Earl of Ulster, but Henry refused that royal honor out of spite for Conn's previous warfare against his crown. The earldom of Tyrone was eventually granted in 1542. The submission of Conn O'Neill led to a 50-year civil war within Ulster that eventually led to downfall of O'Neill power in 1607 with the departure of the third earl for Rome and exile.

He did not share the moderate relationship with the English that his father had cultivated. He was almost always at war with the Lord Lieutenant in Dublin. An act of the English Parliament in 1562 gave Shane O'Neill the English title of Lord O'Neill until his claim for his father's estate was settled. The writ for Shane to be named the second Earl of Tyrone was written, but held up on Dublin. Shane rebelled and was killed before he could be invested and in 1569, the retrospective attainder of Shane O'Neill banned the use of the title of The O'Neill Mór.

The title The O'Neill Mór was not a patrilineal hereditary one, but was conferred on the man elected and inaugurated to rule Tír Eoghain. The title did not have to be from a Tyrone sept, as at least two Clannaboy chiefs also served as The O'Neill Mór. However, there are a few families that may, and some do, claim the rights of O'Neill of Tyrone. These claimants are made up of descendants of the last King and sons of the first Earl (Conn): Shane, Ferdocha (Mathew), and Phelim Caoch. These claimants include O'Neill of Corab, O'Neill of Waterford, McShane-Johnson O'Neills of Killetragh, and O'Neill of Dundalk, as well as the primogeniture of the Marqués de Larraín who still use the titular title of Prince of Tyrone. All descend from one of the last chiefs of the O'Neills of Tyrone.

Upon the death of Shane, his tanist and cousin, Turlough Luineach O'Neill became the paramount Ulster chief. Turlough was the son of Conn Bacach's uncle, and was the fourth son of Niall Connallach macArt óg O'Neill, Tanist of Tyrone (1519–1544). Turlough assumed the position of The O'Neill Mor and held it through a great deal of fighting until 1595 when he died. During his Chiefship, Turlough initially battled the sons of his predecessor Shane, who were called the MacShanes, but soon after established a peace with the brothers, granting them the eastern third of his lands (Glenconkeyn and parts of Tir Eoghan along the western side of Lough Neagh) in return for their military loyalty. MacShanes Conn and his brother Shane both served as Turlough's tanists at different times. At the same time, Turlough battled the up-and-coming Baron of Dungannon, Hugh Rua O'Neill who was placed in Ulster as a counterweight to Turlough's power by the English. Hugh Rua eventually succeeded to the title of Earl of Tyrone and upon Turlough's death, became The O'Neill Mor himself.

After nearly a decade of warfare with the English forces in Ireland, Hugh O'Neill, Earl of Tyrone, surrendered in 1603, just days after the death of his enemy Queen Elizabeth. Hugh stayed in Ulster as the Earl for another five years. But after numerous threats to his life, he secretly departed Ireland for the French coast in 1607 in what is famously called the Flight of the Earls. Hugh continued to use his title after he fled to the Continent in the Flight of the Earls, although in the law of the Kingdom of Ireland it was forfeit by act of the Irish Parliament a year later. So did his son Shane O'Neill, whose will left his title to his only, if illegitimate, son Hugo Eugenio O'Neill; when he died in 1641 at the head of his regiment in Spain. Other Spanish exiled descendants of Hugh Rua continued to use the title and command the Ulster Irish Regiment in the Spanish Army through the seventeenth century.

The barony of Dungannon was created in 1542 as the title designated for the declared heir of the Earldom. Ferdocha or Mathew O'Neill, natural son of Conn Bacach the 1st Earl, was the first to hold the title of Baron Dungannon. The line that descended from Mathew kept the Baron of Dungannon as one of its junior titles at least through the death of Don Eugenio O'Neill, Conde de Tiron in 1695. There were other titles laid out in the will of Don Juan (John/Shane/Sean) O'Neill, Earl of Tyrone, in 1660. They include Viscount of Tyrone, Viscount of Montoy, Baron of Strabane, and Lord of the Clannaboy. There is a later account of the O'Neills acquiring the comital title of Clanawley. Although the title of Baron of Dungannon would traditionally still be preserved with the title of Count/Earl of Tyrone, it is not currently used by anyone in the extended O'Neill family.

Another of the more famous O'Neills of Tyrone was Owen Roe O'Neill (c. 1590–1649), a brilliant 17th-century military commander and one of the most famous of the O'Neill family of Ulster. He was the son of Art O'Neill, a younger brother of Hugh O'Neill, 2nd Earl of Tyrone. As a young man, he left Ireland in the Flight of the Earls to escape the English conquest of his native Ulster. He grew up in the Spanish Netherlands and spent 40 years serving in the Irish regiment of the Spanish Army, mainly in the Eighty Years' War against the Dutch Republic in Flanders, notably at the siege of Arras, where he commanded the Spanish garrison. O'Neill was, like many Gaelic Irish officers in the Spanish service, hostile to the English Protestant invasion of Ireland. He returned to Ireland during the Irish Rebellion of 1641 to command the Irish Ulster Army during the Irish Confederate Wars. He was reportedly poisoned by Cromwell's supporters and died in 1649.

Slight-Arte O'Neills 

This is another branch of the Tyrone O'Neills which started in the mid 15th century. The name translates to "of the sept of Art". Eoghan Mór O'Neill (Owen the Great), King of Tír Eoghan (Tyrone) from 1432 to 1456 had four sons who each started independent lines. His eldest, Henry, was King of Tyrone from 1455 to 1489 and was the grandfather of Conn Bacach. Aodh, his second son started the line of the Fews. Art, his third son, was King of Tyrone 1509–1514. This branch of the family held its lands in western Tyrone and was typically at a distance from those O'Neills centered on the traditional capitol of Dungannon. Art was unable to elevate his son to the kingship, but his grandson was Sir Turlough Luineach O'Neill, The O'Neill Mor 1567–1593, the Earl of ClanConnell, and de jure King of Tyrone for a rocky period during the 1570s. On his deathbed he passed his chiefship to his cousin Hugh O'Neill, 2nd Earl of Tyrone. That family, after Sir Turlough's death, remained hostile to the Earl and often sided with the English when in conflict with the rest of the Tyrone O'Neills.

O'Neills of Clanaboy

Hugh Boy, son of Donnell Og O'Neill, grandson of Aodh Meith O'Neill (Hugh the Fat), and great-grandson of Áed in Macáem Tóinlesc, all kings of Cenél nEógain of the Northern Uí Néill, was the eponymous ancestor of the O'Neill Clandeboy line. He had come to an arrangement with the Norman Earls of Ulster which allowed his sons, particularly Brian, to consolidate O'Neill power within The North at the expense of the O'Donnells. Hugh Boy was married to Eleanor de Nangle, a kinswoman to his nominal enemy, Walter de Burgh, the Earl of Ulster and Jocelyn de Angulo; Hugh died in 1283. The lineage he established remained senior among the O'Neill's, becoming semi-independent with a distinct territory. Having helped the Anglo-Norman barons in a rebellion against their fellow Norman lord, the Earl of Ulster, the family was granted land outside the North, in Ulster within what is now south County Antrim. That was the official establishment of the Lordship of Cloinne Aodha Buidhe, or the O'Neills of Clandeboye, though the English retained lordship over the much-reduced Earldom of Ulster.

The family fought on both sides of the wars that racked Ireland from the 1530s to 1690s, whose end result was a significant loss of territory and influence due to political alliances and an influx of new families flowing in from Scotland and England.

The issue of Sir Henry O'Neill, who had been granted the Edenduffcarrick estate and majority of the Clandeboye lands by conforming to English ways and converting to Anglicanism, died out in 1855. At this time, the barrister Charles Henry O'Neill of the O'Neills of the Feevah, descendant of the last tanaiste of Clandeboye, Sir Henry's uncle Con Mac Brian O'Neill, became officially recognized as The O'Neill Clanaboy. "The descendants of Prince Con MacBryan O'Neill, Tanist of Clanaboy, remained loyal, under every vicissitude, to the traditions of their house, and saved little out of the general wreck of confiscation. They seemed to have preferred fulfilling the solemn pledge of their ancestor, Donald O'Neill, King of Ulster, to 'fight out as long as life should last' rather than adapt themselves to altered circumstances, as the descendants of Shane MacBryan had wisely done," according to Burke's Peerage. In fact both Sir Henry and his daughter Rose willed the Shane's Castle estate to the descendants of Prince Con mac Brian. While Charles Henry assumed the title, the Clandeboye O'Neill estate was passed to William Chichester through his grandmother Mary O'Neill – a move highly disputed. Charles Henry O'Neill had his first and only child, a daughter named Elizabeth Catherine Theresa Mary O'Neill, in 1845, during the Great Hunger, and had no further issue. From the death of Charles Henry O'Neill until Jorge O'Neill assumed the chieftainship the family had no chief.

O'Neill Descendants in France, Spain, and Portugal
In the beginning of the 18th century Felix O'Neill: senior male in linear descent of the line of Brian Ballach O'Neill, and Niall Mór O'Neill's second eldest son, was dispossessed of all his estate through the confiscation applied via the Penal Laws, which led him to emigrate to France. He was a cavalry officer who took part in many battles with the heroic Irish Brigade of the French Army. He fought with the French against the British, the Austrians, and the Dutch (during the War of the Spanish Succession), in the celebrated Battle of Malplaquet, where he died on 11 September 1709.[1][2]

His son Conn (Constantine) O'Neill was an officer who spent his life in exile in France and married to Cecilia O'Hanlon. Their eldest son, João O'Neill (Shane O'Neill), was born in Richhill Village in the parish of Kilmore, Tyrone, and died in Santos o Velho, Lisbon, on 21 January 1788. He left France with his brothers and established their noble line permanently under in the Kingdom of Portugal. He was the titular head of the Clanaboy O'Neill dynasty, whose family have been in Portugal ever since. The current head of the Clanaboy O'Neill dynasty, a descendant of João, is Hugo Ricciardi O'Neill, the son of Jorge Maria O'Neill, of Portugal.

In 1896 Jorge O'Neill of Portugal submitted his genealogy to the Somerset Herald in London. Five years later, Sir Henry Farnham Burke, KCVO, CB, FSA, Somerset Herald stated in 1900 that "the only Pedigree at present on record in either of the Offices of Arms showing a lineal male descent from the House of O'Neill, Monarchs of Ireland, Kings of Ulster, and Princes of Tyrone and Claneboy, is the one registered in the fifty-ninth year of the Reign of Our Sovereign Lady Victoria, in favor of His Excellency Jorge O'Neill of Lisbon". He then recognized him as the Representative of the House of O'Neill and as the Representative of the Earldom created in 1542 for his kinsman Conn Baccagh O'Neill. All of this was granted under Letters Patent issued by the English College of Heralds. Later, the Ulster and Norroy King of Arms granted him the undifferenced arms as the head of the House of O'Neill. Upon that Letters Patent, Pope Leo XIII, the King of Spain, and the King of Portugal all recognized Jorge O'Neill as the Prince of Clanaboy, Tyrone, Ulster, as the Count of Tyrone, and the Head of the Royal House of O'Neill and all of its septs. It was from this grant that the Chief Herald of Ireland recognized the family as the Princes of Clannaboy in 1945. The grandson of Jorge and present Prince of Clanaboy, Hugo, has not pressed his senior claim to the entire House of O'Neill out of respect for his O'Neill chief cousins and their own histories.

Hugo Ricciardi O'Neill is recognised by the offices of arms throughout Europe as titular "Prince and Count of Clanaboy". He uses the title and style of "The O'Neill of Clanaboy". The name Clanaboy (or Clandeboye) is a corruption of the Gaelic family name of 'Cloinne Aodha Buidhe' or 'Family of Fair-Haired Hugh'. The O'Neills of Bellaghy are of this line. Count O'Nelley of the Austro-Hungarian Army (circa 1750) is of this line and from the MacShanes, as are the O'Neills of the Feeva. The traditional title of the head of this family branch is The O'Neill Buidhe or The O'Neill of Clannabuidhe. The O'Neill of Clanaboy is the only O'Neill prince recognized as one of the hereditary Chiefs of the Name of Ireland. They are a dominant family to this day in Counties Antrim, Louth, and eastern Armagh.

O'Neills of Shane's Castle
The castle at Edenduffcarrick now called Shane's Castle has long been a key family in the Clannaboy clan of O'Neills. Shane MacBrien O'Neill changed the name to Shane's Castle in 1722. After the Plantation of Ulster, some O'Neill families converted to the Church of Ireland and began to intermarry with the new nobility coming from England. One such union between Mary O'Neill, the daughter of Henry O'Neill the lord of Shane's Castle, and Arthur Chichester. It is through this marriage that the present day Barons of Shane's Castle trace their lineage to the royal family of O'Neill. The present day title of Baron O'Neill of Shane's Castle is a title in the Peerage of the United Kingdom. It was created in 1868 for the musical composer The Reverend William O'Neill. Born William Chichester, he succeeded to the estates of his cousin John Bruce Richard O'Neill, 3rd Viscount O'Neill, in 1855 (on whose death the viscountcy and barony of O'Neill became extinct) and assumed by Royal licence the surname of O'Neill in lieu of Chichester in order to inherit the lands of his cousin, despite not being descended in the male line from an O'Neill, daughter of Henry O'Neill of Shane's Castle. Lord O'Neill was the patrilineal great-great-great-grandson of John Chichester, younger brother of Arthur Chichester, 2nd Earl of Donegall. The latter two were both nephews of Arthur Chichester, 1st Earl of Donegall, and grandsons of Edward Chichester, 1st Viscount Chichester (see the Marquess of Donegall for more information). Lord O'Neill was succeeded by his eldest son, the second Baron. He sat as a Conservative Member of Parliament for Antrim.

His eldest son and heir apparent, the Hon. Arthur O'Neill, represented Antrim Mid in the House of Commons as a Conservative from 1910 until 1914, when he was killed in action during the First World War, the first MP to die in the conflict. The second Baron was therefore succeeded by his grandson, Shane O'Neill, 3rd Baron O'Neill (the son of the Hon. Arthur O'Neill). He was killed in action in Italy during the Second World War where he served as a Battalion Commander of the North Irish Horse regiment. His wife later remarried to the famous spy novelist, Ian Fleming.

As of 2017 the title is held by his son, the fourth Baron, Sir Raymond O'Neill who succeeded in 1944. He was Lord Lieutenant of Antrim from 1994 to 2008 for which he was knighted in 2014. As a descendant of the first Viscount Chichester he is in remainder to the barony and viscountcy of Chichester and, according to a special patent in the letters patent, the earldom of Donegall, titles held by his kinsman the Marquess of Donegall. Two other members of the O'Neill family have been elevated to the peerage. Hugh O'Neill, 1st Baron Rathcavan, was the youngest son of the second Baron O'Neill, while Terence O'Neill, Baron O'Neill of the Maine, Prime Minister of Northern Ireland, was the youngest brother of the third Baron.
The family seat is Shane's Castle, near Randalstown, County Antrim where they are involved in the commercial cattle business.

O'Neills of the Fews
"The Fews" is an area in County Armagh, Northern Ireland, that was a sub-territory under the O'Neills of Tyrone. This O'Neill branch is related to the O'Neill of Tyrone through King Eoghan Mor, circa 1432–1436. The king's younger son Aodh (Hugh) pushed into the territory known as the Fews and founded a lordship there based largely on the unlawful confiscation of considerable amounts of land belonging to the archbishop of Armagh. 

In the rebellion of 1642, Sir Henry O'Neill, a member of the Fews O'Neills, sided with the English crown while his sons and brothers played a prominent part in the rising. Despite his choice of sides his lands were confiscated and divided among a number of Cromwellian settlers. Sir Henry O'Neill was banished to Connacht, to land in County Mayo, Ireland. Exiled with him was his son Captain Sean/Shane O'Neill. Shane's sons took the surname MacShane, or son of Shane. His grandson William anglicized the name to Johnson. He was a major-general in the American Colonial Army and fought the French at Niagara, New York in French-Indian War. For his significant victory he was granted a baronetcy and made Sir William Johnson, 1st Baronet of New York in 1753. The present holder of that estate is Sir Colpoys Johnson, 8th Baronet of New York.

When the Williamite War began in Ireland in 1689, Sir Henry O'Neill's son Turlough was dead and so was Turlough's son Con. The heir to the family's Mayo estate was Con's son Henry, who was a minor and had been sent to France for his education. Despite their non-participation in the war, the O'Neill estates were seized by the Crown. Henry (1676-1745) should subsequently have recovered the confiscated lands; his relatives on the continent feared to send him back to Ireland to stake his claim and the property went by default and was sold in 1702–3. Henry had a heroic career in the French army, rising to become a Lieutenant-Colonel in the Regiment of Clare. He was killed at the Battle of Fontenoy in May 1745, aged 69. Henry was the last undisputed claimant to the lordship of the Fews.

Some O'Neill families today claim descent from this Henry O'Neill, but contemporary documentation show that he died without leaving any descendants. Following Henry's death, Felix O'Neill (c1720-1792) was identified by contemporaries as the "person to whom the Lordship of the Fews in the North of Ireland in right and justice belongeth". Indeed, Felix was considered to have a valid claim to be the Chief of the entire O'Neill clan. In his book "History of Ireland" (1758–62) Abbé James MacGeoghegan of the Irish College in Paris wrote of the house of the O'Neills that "the present representative is Felix O'Neill, the chief of the house of the Fews, and an officer of rank in the service of his Catholic Majesty".

Felix O'Neill was born in Creggan in County Armagh. He descended from Aodh Buidhe O'Neill, brother of Sir Henry O'Neill. Felix left Ireland for a career in the Spanish Army and is well remembered for his rescue of Charles Edward Stuart ("Bonnie Prince Charlie") following the Battle of Culloden. Felix became a lieutenant general in the Spanish Army and his four sons in turn all had honourable careers in the Spanish military. While most of them did not marry and have families, the youngest son Juan O'Neill (1768-1809) married Vincenta Gual y Vives de Cananas from Palma, Mallorca, and took up residence on the island. Having attained the rank of Captain-General, he died aged 40 leaving a son Felix who was only a year old. Through this man the O'Neills of the Fews line continued in Mallorca in the 19th century and in Argentina in the 20th century. The current day Argentinean descendants of Lieutenant General Felix O'Neill therefore have an historical claim to be leaders of this branch of the O'Neill dynasty. In the 2000s, Dr. Tulio José O'Neille of Buenos Aires in Argentina has come to light as the genealogically senior living heir of the O'Neill of the Fews. His grandfather moved from Spain and he is descended from Lt. Gen Felix O'Neille (1 November 1720 — 12 July 1792), from the Creggan, who serve in the Spanish Army, serving at times at Captain General of Aragon and Galicia.

A contrary claim to the leadership of the dynasty comes from Spanish nobleman Don Carlos O'Neill, 12th Marquis de la Granja, who has been described as "the Prince of the Fews". He claims direct descent from the last undisputed "Lord of the Fews" Henry O'Neill although contemporary evidence shows that Henry had no descendants. While the family's precise link to the historical O'Neills of the Fews therefore remains unclear, their descent can be traced back to a certain 'Red' Henry O'Neill and his wife Hanna née O'Kelly, the daughter of counselor John O'Kelly of Keenagh, County Roscommon, whose children relocated to Spain in the 1750s and 1760s.

Henry and Hanna O'Neill became the parents of Arthur O'Neill in 1736. He was born in Dublin, Ireland. He joined the Spanish army in 1752 and was known by the name Don Arturo O'Neill de Tyrone. He served over 20 years in the Spanish colonial service, becoming Governor of Yucatan in October 1792, and later Governor of West Florida. On his return to Spain in 1803 he was appointed to the Supreme Council of War (replacing Governor Miguel de Uztaraiz) and was awarded the title of the 1st Marques Del Norte two years later. Arturo's brothers included Lieutenant-Colonel Niall 'Nicolas' O'Neill y O'Kelly who died at Zaragoza in Spain, and Tulio and Enrique O'Neill y O'Kelly who both relocated to the Caribbean island of St. Croix in the footsteps of a deceased uncle. These two brothers were granted a license by the Spanish crown to create sugar plantations on the island of Puerto Rico in 1783, although they never availed of it.

Tulio O'Neill y O'Kelly married Catherine O'Keefe y Whalen and became the parents of Arturo O'Neill y O'Keefe and Tulio O'Neill y O'Keefe. Don Arturo O'Neill y O'Keefe was born in March 1782 on St. Croix and married Joanna Chabert Heyliger there in April 1802. Arturo and his brother pleaded for permission to take up their father's right to land in Puerto Rico and this was granted in 1804. Arturo moved his family there in March 1810 and his descendants continue to reside there today as well as in Spain and the USA. Arturo became a Lieutenant Colonel on 17 August 1828 in Bayamón, Puerto Rico and inherited the title of Marques Del Norte from his uncle. He died on 7 September 1832 and is reportedly buried in the Roman Catholic Church of Frederiksted, Saint Croix.

Don Tulio O'Neill y O'Keefe was born on St. Croix in September 1784. He became a General in the Spanish army and won distinctions during the Peninsular War fighting the French. He married Manuela de Castilla Quevedo, the daughter of a Spanish noble family, in 1819. However she died shortly after the birth of their son, Don Juan Antonio Luis O'Neill de Castilla. Tulio was promoted to Field Marshal in charge of the Royal Guard in 1828 and it was he who made the public announcement of the birth of a daughter to the King in 1830, namely the future Isabel II of Spain. Tulio died in 1855 and the family line was continued through his son who inherited his mother's titles (the Marques de la Granja, the Marques de Caltojar, the Marques de Valdeosera and the Count of Benajiar). A later descendant of his also took the title of Marques Del Norte that had remained unclaimed by their relations in Puerto Rico. This branch of the family is often referred to as the O'Neills of the Fews of Seville and is currently headed by the Spanish nobleman Don Carlos O'Neill. Any claim of theirs to represent the O'Neills of the Fews dynasty however must be viewed in light of their descent from the junior branch of the O'Neill y O'Keefe family as well as the absence of a proven lineage linking to the historical "Lords of the Fews". The reservation as to clan leadership being made by a junior branch is debatable as Irish inheritance and Spanish inheritance follow different laws.

MacShane O'Neills 
The sept of McShane is a closely related branch of the Tír Eoghain O'Neills. When Shane O'Neill, Prince of Tyrone and chief of all the O'Neill clans, was killed in 1567, he had an estimated ten male children from his various wives and mistresses. As a group they were very young. During Shane's lifetime, he made claim to the legitimate patrimony of these children and thus they were raised in the courts of their various maternal grandfathers and aunts upon his death. These houses included the Gaelic noble families of O'Donnell, Maguire, O'Quinn, MacDonald, and MacLean. Sixteen years later in 1583 a confederation of the brothers met at the court of their uncle, the Chief of the MacLean clan in the Scottish isles. They were given an army of more than 2000 Scots to return to Ulster to attempt to retake their father's estate and title. When they invaded the brothers took the English and the O'Neill chiefs by surprise and created a large sphere of control in eastern Ulster, allied with the MacDonald's of Antrim. In an attempt to characterize them, the English began to refer to the group of brothers as "the Mac-Shanes" which in Gaelic meant "the sons of Shane". For seven years they battled Sir Turlough O'Neill, the recognized O'Neill Mor at the time, and the rising Baron Dungannon and eventually Earl of Tyrone, Hugh Rua O'Neill. The brothers were dealt a blow in 1590 when the Earl of Tyrone captured and hanged three of the brothers. The earl succeeded in capturing and imprisoning another three over the remainder of the decade until there were only two possibly three of the brothers and nephews hiding out in the Glenconkeyne forest in eastern Tyrone. Two sons of Con MacShane O'Neill, Hugh and Ever, became chief raiders within the O'Neill clan living there. That family had saved them as babies when their father had been killed nearby and had since been referred to as the Clan Shanes. In 1593, the Earl of Tyrone had the Clan Shane's chief killed and the family turned to Hugh MacShane as their new leader. Hugh was elected as their chief, and that O'Neill branch has since forth taken on the "MacShane" surname as an honorific for their loyalty to Shane O'Neill and to his battling sons. Hugh McShane O'Neill reigned as chief until 1622 and his sons and grandsons served as the chieftains of the family and were active in the wars and politics of Ulster, Ireland, and Spain for the next two centuries.

Some of Shane's surviving son's were given sizable land after the flight of the earls that had previously belonged to Hugh O'Neill. Henry was given land in Orior, Con was given the estate of Clabbye, and Brian was given land in Clinawly, Fermanagh. Brian's son Edmond was granted control of Lisdawericke, Megin, Cnoghan, Tollohiny Dirrilghta, Knockmcgallcrum & Gortnesillagh. Henry's son Cormocke (Cormac) was given land. This spread the clan throughout the province and lessened their influence. Brian, son of Hugh, the Chief of the McShane O'Neills led the clan in the 1642 Rising, the Irish Confederate Wars, and fought against Oliver Cromwell's Army through the death of his 2nd cousin Owen Roe O'Neill in 1649 and the victory of Cromwell in 1653. Brian remained in Spanish exile until 1666. Two decades later, his son the new Chief, Brian Og (the Younger) led the clan in service of the O'Neill regiments supporting King James II. After the defeat of the Jacobite forces, the family was "attainted" as Irish rebels in 1693, and Brian "Og" left with the Army of King James II and went into exile in France. The eventual heir, Owen McHugh O'Neill, completely dropped any association with the O'Neill name, and just took McShane as a surname due to the Irish Penal Laws, in an attempt to hold his father's small estate.

After the fall of the O'Neill kingship, many MacShanes followed their cousins into military service in Spain and France and even served in the Irish regiments with their family and former enemies, the descendants of Hugh Rua O'Neill, the 2nd Earl. By the end of the 17th century, the Earl's line failed in exile, and the "Mac Shane" line legally inherited the chiefship and title. This line is presently in remainder to the Gaelic Principality and Earldom of Tyrone, the Viscountcy of Montjuich, and various lordships around Ulster. Further, with the Oireachtas act of March 2015, which reversed the Attainder of Shane O'Neill from 1569, the family have the recognized legal rights to the historical legacy and incorporeal property of Conn Bacach O'Neill, Shane the Proud, and Hugh O'Neill, Earl of Tyrone.

In the early 18th century, in an effort to retain property, many McShane families began to translate their surname from the Gaelic "Son of John" or "Mc Shane" to the English "Son of John" or Johnson. A good example is Major General Sir William Johnson, Bt. His father had been born a McShane but translated his name, allowing his son to succeed to his uncles properties. By the early-19th century most of the official documents fail to show any McShane families in their former territory as all of them had converted to the surname Johnson. However, by the 20th century, many of the Irish branches were returning to the Gaelic name. Today the clan recognizes McShane, Johnson, Johnston, and Shane as elements of the family and are still active and viable in Ulster, America, and Australia. The family leadership today is directly descended from Shane's son Conn, to his son Hugh McShane O'Neill and is closely involved in the greater O'Neill clan activities and their present chief takes part in the Association of O'Neill Clans and is on the O'Neill family council.

Most recently, DNA tests and research have proven the linkage between the MacShanes and the O'Neills of Tyrone. In a study begun in 2002, Patrick Guinness funded Trinity College, Dublin to conduct a DNA study on the O'Neil's of Ulster, to include the MacShane family. The results were published by Ed O'Neill and the late John McLaughlin that showed the McShanes were 100% match of a unique DNA sequence that is specific to the Chiefly line of the Tyrone O'Neills. It is estimated by Trinity College that the specific gene 'break' with the rest of the O'Neills of Ulster was either Aedh Macaomh Toinleasg O'Neill, King of Cenel Eoghain from 1176 to 1177, or his father, Muircheartach Muighe Line O'Neill.

Caribbean O'Neills 
Many O'Neills moved to the Caribbean, especially from the lines of the Counts of Tyrone of Hugh MacFerdorcha O'Neill. Their close connection to the Spanish government after the final fall of the O'Neills in 1690 provided the opportunity for new territory. Family documents  that the O'Neill's had elements land on the Islands and were associated with the families of Rocco, Eammon, Constatino or Conn Eoghan, Edmundo, and Gill – all men who served in the Ultonia and Hibernia regiments for the Crown of Spain. Recent findings show that other O'Neill's settled in Puerto Rico in the 18th century. The earliest record, based on documents from the Spanish royal courts, show that Don Juan O'Neill arrived in Puerto Rico in the 1710s. Two O'Neill officers served in the Spanish Army forces of Bernardo de Galvez fighting the English in Florida and Alabama during the American Revolution.

Tulio and Enrique O'Neill y O'Kelly, of the O'Neills of the Fews, became residents of St. Croix in the 1770s in the footsteps of a deceased uncle. Tulio's sons, Arturo and Tulio O'Neill y O'Keefe, were granted land in Puerto Rico in 1804. Arturo moved his family there in March 1810 and his descendants continue to reside there today as well as in Spain and the USA.

Most O'Neill families of Puerto Rico have for many generations resided in the districts of Hato Nuevo, Mamey, and Sonadora of the city of Guaynabo on the northern coast of the island of Puerto Rico. Other O'Neill families have settled in the cities of Río Piedras and Caguas. Many other O'Neill families that moved from Barbados settled on the Island of Vieques. The O'Neills have been mayors of their cities.

The O'Neills of Martinique settled in the early 1700s; in the next century, they claimed to be Count of Tyrone and lineally descended from Hugh O'Neill, Earl of Tyrone. This claim (which rested on a single-sentence document in their own possession) is currently regarded as unproven. The main stem of this family is now extinct in the male line; collateral descendants may exist.

Today
Today the ancient O'Neills flourish in Ireland, Europe, and the New World. Clan organizations and meetings are held regularly, and the family organization is recognized by every Irish historical governing body. The O'Neills are represented, and are the current presidents of, the Standing Council of Irish Chiefs and Chieftains. They are members of the Clans of Ireland, and hold status with the Councils of each County in Ulster. And before the Government of Ireland stopped recognizing chiefs, they were one of the original chiefly families recognized in 1945 by the Chief Herald of Ireland. They still maintain good relations with the government in Dublin and have hosted the President of Ireland in Ulster twice. Most recently the parliament in Dublin reversed the legal attainments against O'Neill chiefs dating back to 1569.

Three of the ancient O'Neill dynasties or principalities, are still represented by direct descendants of the once independent kings, the O'Neills of Clannaboy, the Fews, and the McShane O'Neills of Tyrone. The chiefships pass under the elective derbfine system of Irish Brehon law, but many incumbents were also granted further titles that are inherited under primogeniture by various Roman Catholic kingdoms in Europe and by the British crown who today possess and use titles in Ireland, Spain, France, Scotland, Portugal, England, Australia, South Africa and the Americas. Further, O'Neills hold five existing House of Lords Peerages in Ulster, Scotland, and England.

Overseas branches flourish, such as in South Africa where descendants are referred to as Nels, mainly due to the influence of the Afrikaner people of the country. The family maintains a loose confederation with its sept princes and chiefs centered in Ireland, meeting annually. This chief's group met in 2007 to commemorate and retrace the Flight of the Earls, in 2010 outside Paris to announce a new, global clan organization that has the goal of constructing an O'Neill museum in Ulster as a central repository for all the family artifacts spread across the world. In 2013 they established a historical relationship with the Priory at Benburb, they met in 2015 to promote the O'Neill Summer School from Shane's Castle, in 2016 in Rome to commemorate the 400th anniversary of the death of the 2nd Earl, Hugh O'Neill, and in October 2017 they established a library and museum at the Priory in Benburb, presenting a historical writings collection previously in private hands out of Ireland for centuries.

Geneticists at Trinity College, Dublin suggested in 2006 that Niall of the Nine Hostages may have been the most fecund male in Irish history. Of their Irish sample, the geneticists found that 21 percent of men from north-western Ireland, 8 percent from all of Ireland, a substantial percentage of men from western and central Scotland, and about 2 percent of men from New York bore the same Y-chromosome haplotype. The geneticists estimated that about 2–3 million men bear this haplotype. Moore et al. concluded that these men descend from "a single early-medieval progenitor" and proposed that this could be Niall. According to the PBS documentary series Finding Your Roots, Bill O'Reilly, Stephen Colbert, Colin Quinn, Bill Maher, and the show's host, Henry Louis Gates Jr. all display STR markers consistent with the Irish Modal Haplotype.

Coats of arms
It is a common misconception that there is one coat of arms associated to everyone of a common surname, when, in fact, a coat of arms is property passed through direct lineage. This means that there are numerous families of O'Neill under various spellings that are related, but because they are not the direct descendants of an O'Neill that owned an armorial device do not have rights or claims to any arms themselves.

The coat of arms of the O'Neills of Ulster, the branch that held the title of High Kings of Ireland, were white with a red left hand (latterly, the Red Hand of Ulster), and it is because of this prominence that the red hand (though a right hand is used today, rather than the left used by the high kings) has also become a symbol of Ireland, Ulster, Tyrone and other places associated with the family of O'Neills. The red hand by itself has become a symbol of the O'Neill name, such that when other O'Neill family branches were granted or assumed a heraldic achievement, this red hand was often incorporated into the new coat of arms in some way.

The red hand is explained by several legends, with a common theme but of a promise of land to the first man to sail or swim across the sea and touch the shores of Ireland. Many contenders arrive, including a man named O'Neill, who begins to fall behind the others. O'Neill cuts off his left hand and throws it onto the beach before the other challengers can reach the shore, becoming the first to touch land and win all of Ireland as his prize. These legends seem to originate (or to have been written down) in the 17th century, centuries after the red hand device was first used by O'Neill families.

Anradhán kindred of Scotland/Scottish and Irish Clans related to Uí Neill dynasty

Several Scottish families may descend from an O'Neill dynast named Anradhán. According to Leabhar Chlainne Suibhne, Anradhán, son of Aodh Athlamháin, quarrelled with his elder brother, Domhnall, ancestor of the O'Neills, and left Ireland for Scotland. This source states that Anradhán won extensive lands by conquest, and married the daughter of the King of Scots. Anradhán, who does not appear in contemporary sources, was apparently an 11th-century dynast, son of Aodh Athlamháin, King of Aileach (died 1033). Although Leabhar Chlainne Suibhne states that Anradhán gained his lands through conflict, it is possible that he secured these lands in Argyll through marriage to their heiress. Leabhar Chlainne Suibhne, Dubhaltach Mac Fhirbhisigh's genealogies, and Cú Choigcríche Ó Cléirigh's pedigrees specifically state that the MacSweens were descended from Anradhán. According to Mac Fhirbhisigh's genealogies, Ó Cléirigh's pedigrees, and MS 1467, the Lamonts were also descendants. MacLachlans were also descendants, according to Ó Cléirigh's pedigrees and MS 1467. According to MS 1467, the MacSorleys of Monydrain, ([of Clan MacDonald of Dunnyveg a branch of Clan Donald) and MacEwens of Otter are also descendants. The Gilchrists appear to be another family descended from Anradhán. The original Gaelic surname of the Highland Livingstones suggests that they were also descendants. There is uncertainty regarding the ancestry of the MacNeills. The family of Barra may well be unrelated to the family of Taynish and Gigha. It is uncertain if either family descended from Anradhán, although tradition dating to the turn of the twentieth century suggests that the Barra family may have.

Siol Alpin as noted above the Uí Neill dynasty are descended from Siol Alpin 
Clan Bruce Clan claim descent from the Connachta's Uí Briúin.
Clan Cumming Clan related to the Uí Néill.
Clan Donald Claims to be traced back to through a long line of ancestors back to the High Kings of Ireland, namely Colla Uais and Conn of the Hundred Battles to Cairbre Lifechair a commons ancestor of the Uí Néill and the Connachta
Clan Ewen of Otter claim descent from the Ui Neill.
Clan Gregor claim descent from Siol Alpin.
Clan Irvine claim descent from the O'Neill
Clan Maccallum claim descent from the Ui Neill.
Clan MacLean intermarried with the Ui Neill.
Clan Macquarrie claim descent from Siol Alpin
Clan Macqueen alleged to be of same descent as Clan Donald.
Clan MacSweeney-as noted above claim descent from Uí Néill.
Clan Munro claim descent from the O'Neill
Clan Oliphant intermarried with the Bruce Clan
Clann Ruaidhrí Claim descent from the O'Neill
Ó Brádaigh-sept of the O'Brian clan.
De Burgh/Burke-married into the O'Brian Clan
O'Carroll clan -related to the Ui Neill.
O'Cahan - claim descent from the Uí Néill. 
Clan Ó Ceallaigh-related to the Uí Néill.
Clann Cholmáin/O'Melaghlin-MacLaughlin Clan claim descent from the Southern Uí Néill.
 Ó Cléirigh Clan intermarried with the O'Nell 
Ó Coileáin related to the Uí Néill.
Ó Conchubhair claim descent from the Connachta's Uí Briúin.
Ó Conghalaigh intermarried with the Uí Néill.
O'Connell Clan intermarried with the O'Brians.
Ó Dálaigh Clan claim descent from a son of Niall of the Nine Hostages.
Dempsey Clan intermarried with the O'Nell 
O'Devlin clan claim descent from Uí Néill.
O'Doherty clan claim descent from Uí Néill.
O'Donnell dynasty Clan claim descent from Uí Néill.
Donnellan clan related to the Uí Néill
O'Donnelly Clan claim descent from Uí Néill.
O'Donovan Clan (Descended from the House of Ivar) intermarried with O'Brian clan
Ó Fionnagáin Finnegan Clan claim descent from father of Niall of the Nine Hostages.
FitzGeralds intermarried with the Uí Néill.
O'Gallagher Clan claim descent from Uí Néill.
Gavigan Clan claim descent from the Southern Uí Néill.
O'Gorman Clan intermarried with the Uí Néill.
O'Grady Clan are distant relations of the O'Brian Clan.
O'Higgins family claim descent from the Southern Uí Néill.
Ó Flaithbheartaigh Clan claim descent from the Connachta's Uí Briúin.
Kavanagh Clan claim descent from the Connachta's Uí Briúin.
O'Kelly Clan related to the Uí Néill
Mac Brádaigh Clan. They claim descent from High King of Ireland Eochaid Mugmedon.
McCarthy Clan intermarried with the O'Brian Clan.
Magennis Clan intermarried with the O'Neill Clan
Maguire Clan related to the Uí Néill.
Clan Mackintosh reported to be related to the O'Neill Clan
McGovern Clan
McGuinness Clan intermarried with the O'Neill Clan
McCausland Clan claim descent from the Cenel Eoghain race in County Londonderry and Tyrone, a branch of the Ui Neil.
O'Murphy Clan claim descent from the Northern Uí Néill
O'Mahony Clan. Married into the O'Brian Clan.
O'Reilly Clan. The clan were part of the Connachta's Uí Briúin Bréifne kindred and were closely related to the Ó Ruairc (O'Rourkes) of West Bréifne. 
O'Rourke Clan. They claim descent from High King of Ireland Eochaid Mugmedon through his son Brión (whence the Uí Briúin), the half-brother of High King Niall of the Nine Hostages, the acclaimed ancestor of the Uí Néill.
Síol Muireadaigh Clan related to the Uí Néill.
O'Toole Clan intermarried with the Uí Néill.

See also
O'Neill baronets
Sir Neil O'Neill, 2nd Baronet
Battle of St. George's Caye
List of Colonial Governors of Florida
Eoin MacNeill
Jack O'Neill (businessman)
James P. O'Neill NYPD Commissioner
Ralph Ambrose O'Neill Air Ace
Richard W. O'Neill {Medal of Honor}
William Owen Buckey O'Neill soldier and lawman

Places
O'Neill Hall
Shane's Castle
Tullyhogue Fort

Related
O'Cahan
O'Higgins family
Branches of the Cenél nEógain
Northern Uí Néill
Southern Uí Néill
Irish nobility
Ambrosio O'Higgins, 1st Marquis of Osorno descended from the O'Neill dynasty
MacShane, McShane, Sir William Johnson, 1st Baronet Of New York an O'Neill branch
King Brian Boru of the Uí Briúin an Irish dynasty of Connacht. Their eponymous apical ancestor was Brión, son of Eochaid Mugmedon and Mongfind, and an elder half brother of Niall of the Nine Hostages. 
The Rival O'Rourke and O'Reilly Clans also claim descent from the Uí Briúin 
The Scottish MacDonald Clan claims descent from Conn of the Hundred Battles an ancestor of Niall of the Nine Hostages; allegedly the MacQueen Clan claims the same descent as the MacDonald Clan

References

Bibliography

 Mémorial Historique et Généalogique de la Maison O’Neill de Tyrone et de Claneboy, published by Bergerac, Imprimerie Générale du Sud-Ouest (J. Castanet), 3 rue Saint-Esprit, Bergerac, France, 1899.
 The Spanish Monarchy and Irish Mercenaries, R.A.Stradling
 The O' Neills in Spain, Spanish Knights of Irish Origin, Destruction by Peace, Micheline Kerney Walsh. The Irish Sword, Vol 4–11
 Erin's Blood Royal: The Gaelic Nobel Dynasties of Ireland, Peter Berresford Ellis
 The Wild Geese, Mark G. McLaughlin.
 Wild Geese in Spanish Flanders,1582–1700, B. Jennings.
 General History of Martinique, 1650–1699
 Annals of Ireland by the Four Masters, O'Clery, Dublin 1846
 Archivo General de Simancas
 Archivo General de Indias
 Archivo de la Chancilleria de Valladolid
 Archivo Histórico Nacional, Spain
 The Belfast Newsletter, Thursday 12 March 2015
 "Conn O'Neill of Kilskerry", The Clogher Record, vol 6, no. 2, 1967. 
 Burke's Peerage, volume 107.
 Debrett's Peerage and Baronetage 1995, edited by Charles Kidd and David Williamson, published by Debrett's Peerage Limited, and Macmillan Reference Books, London, 1995,  & 0-312-12557-7],
 Registro demografico de Puerto Rico
 Obispado de San Juan, Puerto Rico
 King James Army List, 1689–1691
 Irish Names and Surnames by Rev. Patrick Woulfe, 1923
 The O'Neills of Ulster; Their History and Genealogy, Volume III, by Thomas Mathews, Dublin, Sealy, Bryers & Walker, 1907 
 The History of Irish Brigades in the service of France, Shannon (1969)
 The Journal of the Kilenny and Southeast of Ireland, Vol 5. 1864–66, Dublin. pg.90–99, 457–459, 301–302
 The General Armory of England, Scotland, and Wales, pg. 758.
 The Fall of the Irish Chiefs and Clans, by George Hill
 The Royal Families in Europe, Edition V, O'NEILL, by Ulwencreutz Media 2013
 "No. 23370". The London Gazette. 14 April 1868
 Tyrone's Rebellion, by Hyram Morgan
 Don Bernardo O'Neill of Aughnacloy, Co. Tyrone, by Michelin K. Walsh. pg. 320–325
 Census of Ireland 1901
 Calendar of the State Papers of Ireland 1660–1662, pg. 706, Edt by Robert Mahaffy, London, 1905.
 Shane O'Neill, by Ciaran Brady, pg. 22–51. Dundalgan Press, Dundalk, Ireland 1996
 Royal O'Neill, Desmond O'Neill, 1996.
 Phelim (Felix) O'Neill's Genealogy in a Portuguese Genealogical site
 Puerto Rico : Desde sus origenes hasta el cese de la dominacion Espanola, pg. 346 by Luis M. Diaz Soler 
 Holohan, Renagh. The Irish Châteaux – In search of Descendants of the Wild Geese, with illustrations by Jeremy Williams, published by The Lilliput Press, Dublin, 2008. 

 British Library, Harley MS 5885 (N.L.I. Dublin POS no. 1426) and British Library, Harley MS 6096 (N.L.I. Dublin POS no. 1427)
 Sidney, H., Sir Henry Sidney's Memoir of his government of Ireland 1583, Ulster Journal of Archaeology, First series, Vol. III, 1855, p. 46. Footnote no. 6.
 Burkes of East Galway, Volume 1
 Journal of Genetic Genealogy, http://jogg.info/22/ONeill.pdf

External links
 Association of O'Neill Clans
 About the name O'Neil
 Northern Uí Néill
 Clan McShane

 
Irish royal families
Gaels